Vampyriscus (meaning: small vampire bat) is a genus of bats in the family Phyllostomidae, the leaf-nosed bats.

There are three species previously included in the genus Vampyressa. The two genera are differentiated by the morphology of their bones and teeth and the pattern of their pelage. Phylogenetic analyses support the separation of the genera. Older sources recognize Vampyriscus as a subgenus of Vampyressa.

Species:
Vampyriscus bidens – bidentate yellow-eared bat
Vampyriscus brocki – Brock's yellow-eared bat
Vampyriscus nymphaea – striped yellow-eared bat

References

External links
Vampyriscus. Integrated Taxonomic Information System (ITIS)

Bat genera
Phyllostomidae
Taxa named by Oldfield Thomas